"Bad Habits" is an R&B song by American  R&B singer Maxwell. The song is the second single released from BLACKsummers'night and peaked at number four on Billboard's Hot R&B/Hip-Hop Songs, spending 46 weeks on the chart.

Composition
Musically, "Bad Habits" is written in the key of E minor.

Charts

Weekly charts

Year-end charts

References

External links
 www.musze.com

2009 singles
2009 songs
Maxwell (musician) songs
Columbia Records singles
Music videos directed by Anthony Mandler
Songs written by Maxwell (musician)